John Ellis (25 January 1908 – 20 January 1994) was an English professional footballer who played in the Football League for Bristol Rovers, Hull City and Wolverhampton Wanderers as a goalkeeper. In 1936, when Luton Town's Joe Payne set a Football League record by scoring 10 goals in a 12–0 win over Bristol Rovers, Ellis was the opposition goalkeeper. He later scouted for Leeds United.

Personal life 
Ellis served as a policeman during the Second World War.

Career statistics

Honours 
Wolverhampton Wanderers

 Football League Second Division: 1931–32

References 

Clapton Orient F.C. wartime guest players
English Football League players
English footballers
Association football goalkeepers
1908 births
1994 deaths
People from Tyldesley
Atherton F.C. players
Winsford United F.C. players
Winsford United F.C. managers
West Bromwich Albion F.C. players
English football managers
Player-coaches
Wolverhampton Wanderers F.C. players
Bristol Rovers F.C. players
Hull City A.F.C. players
Leyton Orient F.C. players
Bath City F.C. players
Stalybridge Celtic F.C. players
Mossley A.F.C. players
Leeds United F.C. non-playing staff
British police officers
Rochdale A.F.C. wartime guest players
Stockport County F.C. wartime guest players
Wrexham F.C. wartime guest players